Highway 26, also known as the Barkerville Highway, is a minor east-west highway in the North Cariboo region of the Central Interior of British Columbia, Canada.  First opened in 1967, it provides access to the community of Wells and the famous gold rush town of Barkerville at the foot of the Cariboo Mountains, respectively 75 and 81 km (47 and 51 mi) east of the highway's junction with Highway 97 at Quesnel.  Also accessed by the route is Bowron Lakes Provincial Park, a popular canoeing expedition circuit, the cutoff for which is between Barkerville and Wells.  Since Highway 26 is very lightly travelled, it has not needed any major improvements since its opening.  Its route is approximately the same as that of the Cariboo Wagon Road.

See also

Cottonwood House
Coldspring House
Beaver Pass House
Stanley, British Columbia

References

026
Cariboo